Baras may refer to:
 Baras (Sophene), a town of ancient Sophene, in Mesopotamia
 Baras, Catanduanes, a municipality in the Philippines
 Baras, Rizal, a municipality in the Philippines
 Baras, Indonesia, a subdistrict in Pasangkayu Regency, West Sulawesi
 Baras (TV Lithuania) a Lithuanian reality television program, based on The Bar Swedish reality competition television franchise
; documentary about the avant-garde Lithuanian actor and filmmaker Artūras Barysas "Baras".
 Baras, Raebareli, a village in Uttar Pradesh, India

See also
Barras (disambiguation)
Barrass